Jean Calvignac is an IBM Fellow and was responsible for the architecture of PowerNP, an IBM network processor. He holds more than 220 patents.

Career 

In 1998, at the IBM Laboratory in the Research Triangle Park, Calvignac and his team initiated the IBM network processor activities. He had previously been responsible for system design of the ATM switching products, which he initiated with his team in 1992 at the IBM Laboratory in La Gaude, France. Before that, he had held different management and technical leader positions for architecture and development of communication controller products at the La Gaude Laboratory. Calvignac joined IBM in 1971 as a development engineer in telephone switching products. He received an engineering degree in 1969 from the Grenoble Institute of Technology, France.

Calvignac has been awarded more than 220 patents, mostly in the field of communication and networking. He has contributed to standards and a few scientific papers.

He was named an IBM Fellow in 1997, IBM's highest technical honor. Calvignac is a Fellow of the IET (in Europe) and a Senior Member of the IEEE.

References

External links 
 

French computer scientists
French electrical engineers
20th-century French inventors
Living people
Year of birth missing (living people)
IBM Fellows
IBM people
Fellows of the Institution of Engineering and Technology
Senior Members of the IEEE
Grenoble Institute of Technology alumni
20th-century French engineers
21st-century French engineers
Industry and corporate fellows